XJ may refer to:

 Mesaba Airlines (IATA airline code XJ, 1974-2012)
 Thai AirAsia X (IATA airline code XJ since 2014)
 Jaguar XJ, a car series made by Jaguar
 XJ music, a collaborative instrument for ambient music production
 Jeep Cherokee (XJ), an internal vehicle code used by Jeep
 Yamaha XJ650 Maxim, a motorcycle series made by Yamaha
 Xinjiang, an autonomous region of China (Guobiao abbreviation XJ)